The 11th Independent Battery Wisconsin Light Artillery, was an artillery battery that served in the Union Army during the American Civil War.

Service
The 11th Independent Battery was mustered into service at Madison, Wisconsin, on February 22, 1862.  Later in the month it was transferred to Illinois service as Battery "L," 1st Illinois Light Artillery.

Total strength and casualties
The 11th Independent Battery initially recruited 87 officers and men.  An additional 8 men were recruited as replacements, for a total of 95 men.

The battery suffered 3 enlisted men killed in action or died of their wounds and 2 enlisted men who died of disease or accident, for a total of 5 fatalities.

Commanders
 Captain John Rourke

He went by O'Rourke and by Rourke.  The Capt. John O'Rourke House in Plattsmouth, Nebraska is listed on the National Register of Historic Places.

See also

 List of Wisconsin Civil War units
 Wisconsin in the American Civil War

References

References
The Civil War Archive

Military units and formations established in 1862
Military units and formations disestablished in 1862
Units and formations of the Union Army from Wisconsin
Military units and formations disestablished in 1865
1862 establishments in Wisconsin
Artillery units and formations of the American Civil War